Kanaka is an Indian given name. The Sanskrit word  has the primary meaning "gold". Notable persons with the name include:

 Kanaka (actress) (born 1973), South Indian film actress
 Kanaka Dasa (1509 – 1609), Kannada-language poet, philosopher, musician and composer
 Kanaka Ha Ma (born 1964), Kannada-language writer
 Kanaka Herath, Shri Lankan politician
 Kanaka Srinivasan, Indian classical dancer
 T. S. Kanaka (born 1932), Indian neurosurgeon

References

Indian unisex given names